Honingfontein is a town in Vhembe District Municipality in the Limpopo province of South Africa.

References

Populated places in the Makhado Local Municipality